Southgate Cemetery, sometimes known as Edmonton and Southgate Cemetery or Old Southgate Cemetery, is a cemetery in Waterfall Road, Southgate, London, run by the London Borough of Enfield. The cemetery was established by the Southgate Burial Board in 1880. There is no chapel at the cemetery but Christ Church, Southgate, Church of England church is adjacent on the other side of Waterfall Road.
The cemetery contains the war graves of 92 Commonwealth service personnel, 20 from World War I and 72 from World War II.

Notable interments
 Mary Jane Clarke, suffragette
 William Samuel Glyn-Jones, politician and pharmacist
 Gerald Massey, author
 Thomas Melville, chairman of Southgate Urban District Council
 Charles Frederick Peploe, vicar of Christ Church, Southgate
 Herbie Roberts, professional footballer for Arsenal
 Lionel Keir Robinson, CBE, MC

 George Albert Watts, mayor of St Pancras 1938–39
 Herbert Francis Wauthier, mayor of Southgate 1936–37
 James Edwin Williams, first general secretary of the National Union of Railwaymen
 Frederick Porter Wensley, Chief Constable, CID, Metropolitan Police
 Shoghi Effendi, Guardian of the Bahá'í Faith 1921–57

References

External links 
 
 

Cemeteries in London
Buildings and structures in the London Borough of Ealing
1880 establishments in England
Parks and open spaces in the London Borough of Ealing